The following is a list of lakes in Uganda.

Lakes 
 Lake Albert
 Lake Bisina
 Lake Bugondo
 Lake Buhera
 Lake Bujuku
 Lake Bunyonyi
 Lake Edward
 Lake George
 Lake Kabaka
 Lake Kachera
 Lake Katwe
 Lake Kayumbu 
 Lake Kitandra
 Lake Kwania
 Lake Kyahafi
 Lake Kyoga
 Lake Mburo
 Lake Mutanda
 Lake Mulehe
 Lake Nabugabo
 Lake Nakuwa
 Lake Nkugute
 Lake Nyabihoko
 Lake Nyamusingire
 Lake Opeta
 Lake Saka
 Lake Nyungu
 Lake Rutoto
 Lake Nakivale
 Lake Victoria (shared with Kenya and Tanzania)
 Lake Wamala

References 

Uganda
Lakes
Lakes